George Monson may refer to:

 George Monson (born 1657/8), younger brother of the 3rd and 4th Monson baronets (of Carleton), father of the 1st Baron Monson
 George Monson (1730–1776), brigadier-general in the British Army, third son of the 1st Baron Monson, commander of the 50th (Queen's Own) Regiment of Foot
 George Monson (cricketer) (1755–1823), cricketer, second son of the 2nd Baron Monson